Pandora Peaks (born Stephanie Schick; April 12, 1964) is a retired American adult model for magazine and film, actress, and stripper.  She posed for more than 100 men's magazines, such as Playboy, Score and Gent.

Biography 
In the 1990s, Peaks appeared as a catalog model for Pango Pango swimwear, emphasizing their claim to be able to fit any woman.

Credited as Stephanie Schick, she appeared in minor roles in the 1991 Andy Sidaris spy movie Do or Die, playing the character Atlanta Lee; and in the 1996 Demi Moore film Striptease, playing stripper Urbana Sprawl.

In 1998, Peaks starred in Visions & Voyeurism, a 60-minute documentary-style movie. Shot on location at sites in Hollywood and Southern California, it featured Peaks posing nude, in full view of passers-by. The film has since become a cult classic and has a loyal fan following in Europe.

Peaks starred in the eponymous Pandora Peaks, Russ Meyer's final film, released in 2001. The 72-minute movie has no dialogue, just footage of Peaks undressing, dressing and walking around, with narration by Peaks and Meyer.

References

External links 
 PandoraPeaks.com
 

1964 births
American female adult models
American pornographic film actresses
Living people
Actresses from Atlanta
Pornographic film actors from Georgia (U.S. state)
21st-century American women